Rumors and Headlines is the third full-length album by Californian punk rock group One Man Army, released in 2002 by BYO Records.

Track listing
"Victoria"
"It's Empty"
"S.O.S"
"All Night Long"
"Have Nots and Heartbreak"
"Leave Me Alone"
"Casualty"
"Next Generation"
"She Wants Me Dead"
"Here We Are"
"Rotting in the Doldrums"
"Sleeper"

2002 albums
BYO Records albums
One Man Army (band) albums